The Caspian tadpole goby (Benthophilus macrocephalus) is a species of goby which is widespread in the basin of the Caspian Sea, specifically in the near-estuary zone of the rivers and in small bays. It is a common species in the Volga River delta near Astrakhan, occurred in the deltas of rivers Terek, Ural, Samur. It can reach a length of  TL.

References

Fish of the Caspian Sea
Fish of Central Asia
Fish of Western Asia
Fish of Russia
Benthophilus
Endemic fauna of the Caspian Sea
Fish described in 1787